The 2020 AFL Women's All-Australian team represents the best-performed players of the 2020 AFL Women's season. It was announced on 27 April 2020 as a complete women's Australian rules football team of 21 players. The team is honorary and does not play any games.

Selection panel
The selection panel for the 2020 AFL Women's All-Australian team consisted of chairwoman Nicole Livingstone, Steve Hocking, Josh Vanderloo, Kelli Underwood, Sarah Black, Tim Harrington, Shelley Ware and Sharelle McMahon.

Initial squad
The initial 40-woman All-Australian squad was announced on 3 April.  had the most players selected in the initial squad with five, and every team had at least one representative. Eleven players from the 2019 team were among those selected.

Final team
The final team was announced on 27 April. Finalists ,  and  had the most selections with three, and every team except  and  had at least one representative. Eleven players achieved selection for the first time, while eight players from the 2019 team were selected, two of whom – Melbourne vice-captain Karen Paxman and North Melbourne captain Emma Kearney – achieved selection for the fourth consecutive year. Paxman was announced as the All-Australian captain and Kearney was announced as the vice-captain.

Note: the position of coach in the AFL Women's All-Australian team is traditionally awarded to the coach of the premiership-winning team; as no premiership was awarded in 2020, the coach position was not awarded.

References

External links
 AFLW Awards

2020 AFL Women's season